Philip Congdon (born 6 June 1989) is a British rower.

Congdon competed for Durham University Boat Club and Molesey Boat Club. He won the bronze medal as part of the men's eight at the 2014 European Rowing Championships in Belgrade.

References

1989 births
Living people
British male rowers
Durham University Boat Club rowers
Alumni of Grey College, Durham